Cyperus spiciger is a species of sedge that is native to parts of Brazil.

See also 
 List of Cyperus species

References 

spiciger
Plants described in 1805
Flora of Brazil
Taxa named by Martin Vahl